Akhmerovo (Äxmär) is a rural locality (a selo) in Isheyevsky Selsoviet, Ishimbaysky District, Bashkortostan, Russia. The population was 984 as of 2010. There are 14 streets.

Geography 
Akhmerovo is located 24 km northeast of Ishimbay (the district's administrative centre) by road. Kanakayevo is the nearest rural locality.

References 

Rural localities in Ishimbaysky District
Ufa Governorate